Sydney Davis is a mother, cattle producer and Certified Registered Nurse Anesthetist CRNA, as well as a member of the South Dakota House of Representatives from the 17th district. Elected in November 2020, she assumed office on January 12, 2021.

Education 
Davis earned a Bachelor of Science in Nursing from South Dakota State University and a Master of Science from Mount Marty College.

Career 
Davis has worked as a nurse, nurse anesthetist, and cattle producer. Davis was elected to the South Dakota House of Representatives in November 2020 and assumed office on January 12, 2021, succeeding Ray Ring. On January 4, 2022 she announced her candidacy for the District 17 State Senate seat.

Election history

References 

Living people
Republican Party South Dakota state senators
Women state legislators in South Dakota
South Dakota State University alumni
Mount Marty College alumni
Year of birth missing (living people)
21st-century American politicians
21st-century American women politicians